Ahí Vamos (Spanish for There We Go) is a 2006 studio album by Argentine rock musician Gustavo Cerati. The album was met with both positive reviews by critics and popularity, especially in Venezuela, Argentina, Chile, Colombia and Mexico. The first single released from the album was "Crimen", which received airplay starting in April 2006 and gained huge popularity in Latin America and Spain. The second single, released in September was "La Excepción". The album was certified Platinum in Argentina with only pre-ordered sales, and attained Gold status in Mexico.

On November 2, 2006, the album received the Latin Grammy for Best Rock Solo Vocal Album and " Crimen" won the category for Best Rock Song. The album was also nominated for Album of the Year, but lost to Shakira's Fijación Oral Vol. 1 (in which Cerati is also featured).

The third single released from the album was "Adiós", which played on radio and TV stations in Latin America beginning in February 2007.

In 2008, Cerati released two more singles from the album, "Lago En El Cielo", the fourth song on the album, and "Me Quedo Aquí," the fifth.

Cerati toured Latin America, Spain and the US to promote the album, and also performed for the very first time in London, playing at The Forum on October 12.

The name "Ahí Vamos" ("There We Go") was a phrase repeated many times during the recording sessions, which came to be a war cry for Cerati during the time.

On August 29, 2007, the album's second single "La Excepción" received two Latin Grammy nominations: Record of the Year and Best Rock Song, winning the later and beating Argentine band La Renga and Uruguayan band Cuarteto de nos, among others.

Track listing

Sales and certifications

Personnel

Performing 
 Gustavo Cerati – lead vocals, backing vocals, lead guitar, bass, piano, kalimba, synthesizer, Moog synthesizer, programming, audio filtering
 Richard Coleman – guitar, effects
 Fernando Nalé – bass
 Leandro Fresco – backing vocals, synthesizer, percussion, strings, laptop
 Tweety González – Rhodes fuzz, organ, glockenspiel, piano, synthesizer
 Fernando Samalea – glockenspiel, drums, percussion, drums, octoban, rototom, tam-tam, bandoneón
 Emmanuel Cauvet – drums
 Pedro Moscuzza – drums
 Bolsa González – drums
 Flavius Etcheto – vocal effects
 Capri – synthesizer
 Loló Gasparini – backing vocals
 Paula Zotalis – backing vocals
 Sofía Medrano – ambient voices
 Dina – ambient voices

Technical 
 Gustavo Cerati – record production, music supervision
 Tweety González – record production, sound recording
 Uriel Dorfman – sound recording
 Héctor Castillo – sound recording, audio mixing
 Nicolás "Parker" Pucci – production assistance
 Pablo Gándara – production assistance
 Howie Weinberg – audio mastering
 Bolsa González – drums advising
 Vasco – Pro Tools advising

Additional 
 Ezequiel de San Pablo&Angeles Altoe;– graphic design
 Oscar Fernández – hair
 Jazmín Calcarami – makeup
 Santiago Contreras – photography, illustrations
 Germán Saez – photography
 Nora Lezano – photography
 Sebastián Arpesella – photography
 Gustavo Cerati&Angeles Altoe – illustrations
 Sofía Medrano – illustrations, wardrobe
 Mayol – wardrobe

References 

2006 albums
Gustavo Cerati albums
Sony International albums
Latin Grammy Award for Best Rock Solo Vocal Album